The second series of On the Buses originally aired between 31 May 1969 and 5 July 1969, beginning with "Family Flu". The series was produced and directed by Stuart Allen, and the designer was Andrew Gardner. All the episodes in this series were written by Ronald Chesney and Ronald Wolfe.

It was the first series to use the animated sequence that was continued to use until Series 6, it is also the last series to be broadcast in black and white. (with the exceptions of some episodes of Series 4)

Cast
 Reg Varney as Stan Butler
 Bob Grant as Jack Harper
 Anna Karen as Olive Rudge
 Doris Hare as Mabel "Mum" Butler
 Stephen Lewis as Inspector Cyril "Blakey" Blake
 Michael Robbins as Arthur Rudge

Episodes

{|class="wikitable plainrowheaders" style="width:100%; margin:auto;"
|-
! scope="col" style="background:#00AE2C;color:black;" | Episode No.
! scope="col" style="background:#00AE2C;color:black;" | Series No.
! scope="col" style="background:#00AE2C;color:black;" | Title
! scope="col" style="background:#00AE2C;color:black;" | Directed by
! scope="col" style="background:#00AE2C;color:black;" | Written by
! scope="col" style="background:#00AE2C;color:black;" | Original air date

|}

See also
 1969 in British television

References

External links
Series 2 at the Internet Movie Database

On the Buses
1969 British television seasons